Two Weeks Last Summer is the first solo album by Dave Cousins, singer and guitarist from the Strawbs. It was released in 1972 on A&M Records.

Track listing

All songs written by Dave Cousins

"Two Weeks Last Summer" – (3:07)
"October to May" – (2:27)
"Blue Angel" – (9:48)
"Divided"
"Half Worlds Apart"
"At Rest"
"That's the Way It Ends" (including "The World") – (3:00)
"The Actor" – (4:28)
"When You Were a Child" – (3:02)
"Ways and Means" – (4:22)
"We'll Meet Again Sometime" – (4:48)
"Going Home" – (3:24)

on the CD, the tracks "The World" and "That's the Way It Ends" are listed separately with timings of 1:45 and 1:15 respectively.

Personnel

Dave Cousins – lead vocal, guitars, piano
Dave Lambert – guitars, backing vocals
Miller Anderson – lead guitar, slide guitar
Jon Hiseman – drums, percussion
Roger Glover – bass guitar
Tom Allom – organ, backing vocals
Rick Wakeman – organ, piano
Tom Newman – backing vocals
 The Robert Kirby Wind Septet

The track "Going Home" is credited with personnel "Lampoon". The track had originally been planned as a Dave Lambert single before he joined Strawbs. Cousins replaced Lambert's vocals with his own and released it as a single. It is believed that the other musicians were Blue Weaver on keyboards, John Ford on bass guitar and Richard Hudson on drums. This would have been the first time that this new Strawbs line-up recorded together.

Recording

Dave Cousins – producer
Tom Allom – producer, engineer

Recorded at The Manor, Kidlington, Oxford in June 1972.

Release history

References
Two Weeks Last Summer on Strawbsweb
"Going Home" on Strawbsweb
Liner notes to CD SDRCD 010 Two Weeks Last Summer

1972 debut albums
Albums produced by Tom Allom
A&M Records albums
Dave Cousins albums